= MPWH =

- Website type: Online dating community
- Owner: SuccessfulMatch Inc.
- Website: MPWH.com
- Commercial: Yes
- Registration: Required for membership
- Current status: Active

MPWH (Meeting People With Herpes) is a US-based international dating community for people with herpes. It offers a platform for positive singles who are living with Herpes (HSV-1 and HSV-2) to find support, friendship and love.

== History ==
In 2015, MPWH launched its apps for iOS and Android devices, which provide full functionality as its pc site and mobile site. Currently Michelle Lee is MPWH APP co-founder.

MPWH app was announced by Cosmopolitan UK as a dating app for people with Herpes in September, 2015.

MPWH started to charge its members from March, 2016 PT (Pacific time) for providing a serious and meaningful dating environment.

In 2018, MPWH was incorporated into SuccessfulMatch.com.

== Overview ==
The MPWH business frame is based on a membership system, people with Herpes create profiles with anonymous usernames and join in free of charge. Members have the options to hide or open their profiles or photos to others.

== Matching ==
The MPWH uses Tinder-style matching function called "SPARK" for members finding their matches. "SPARK" offers members' photos with age, gender, location to swipe and encourage members upload photos to enjoy swiping. Members swipe left 'pass' and swipe right to 'like'. If members like each other, MPWH will let them know.
